Jason Gasperoni (born 4 October 1973) is a Sammarinese alpine skier. He competed in three events at the 1992 Winter Olympics.

References

External links
 

1973 births
Living people
Sammarinese male alpine skiers
Olympic alpine skiers of San Marino
Alpine skiers at the 1992 Winter Olympics
Place of birth missing (living people)